The Daugavpils–Indra Railway is a  long,  gauge railway built in the 19th century to connect Daugavpils and Vitebsk.

References 

Railway lines in Latvia
Transport in Daugavpils
Railway lines opened in 1866
19th-century establishments in Latvia
5 ft gauge railways in Latvia
1866 establishments in the Russian Empire